The Honda Motosport 90 or Honda SL90 was a street/trail Honda motorcycle with a high fender. Its engine was a single cylinder 89 cc, single overhead cam configuration. It had a 4-speed transmission and a manual clutch. It was produced only during the 1969 model year and was available in two colors: Candy Ruby Red and Candy Blue. It came with a silver fuel tank stripe and a chrome exhaust system. Its frame was silver with the front wheel measuring 19" and 17" for the rear wheel. The steel fenders matched the basic colors (red or blue).

External links
Some nice images of a red Japanese version Honda SL90 can be found here:  
A couple of images of a blue SL90:  
 1969 Honda restoration blog: http://hondasl90.blogspot.com/

SL90